Locksley may refer to:

 Locksley, Nottinghamshire, fictional home of English folk hero Robin Hood
 Locksley (band), an American rock band
 Locksley, New South Wales, Australia
 Locksley, Victoria, Australia
 Locksley railway station, Victoria, a closed station in Locksley, Victoria, Australia
 Locksley station (Pennsylvania), a railroad station in Thornbury Township, Pennsylvania, USA
 Locksley Christian School, the former name of Regents Academy based in Lincolnshire, England
 Locksley Hall, an Alfred Lord Tennyson poem
 Mike Locksley (born 1969), American football coach

See also
 Loxley (disambiguation)